Stefani Carter (born February 15, 1978) is a former member of the Texas House of Representatives from the 102nd District, which included parts of Dallas, and the northern Dallas County suburbs of Garland, and Richardson, Texas. First elected in 2010, Carter made history by becoming the first Republican African-American woman to serve in the Texas House when she unseated the Democratic incumbent Carol Kent.

Early life
Carter was born in Dallas. She is a practicing Roman Catholic and was baptized in Richardson, Texas. Her mother was an elementary school teacher, and her father is an engineer turned entrepreneur, the owner of a small lawn-care company.

Carter excelled academically in school; her parents told her she would have to work her way through college. She graduated in 1996 from Plano East Senior High School and earned a full scholarship to the University of Texas at Austin, where she graduated with highest honors with a Bachelor of Arts in Government and a Bachelor of Science in Journalism. During Carter's undergraduate years at UT she interned at the White House during the Clinton administration.

After UT, Carter graduated with a Juris Doctor degree from Harvard Law School. She also obtained a master's degree in Public Policy from Harvard's John F. Kennedy School of Government. During Carter's years at Harvard, she became a Republican and contributed articles to USA Today. After law school, she returned to Dallas and served Collin County as an assistant district attorney.

Political career

Carter decided to run for office in the 102nd House District in Texas, taking on Democrat Carol Kent. Carter won by simply pointing to Kent's record as being far too liberal for her area of Dallas and that voters in the district were far more conservative than the person who was representing them.

Carter won in 2010 with 54.63 percent of the vote, having unseated Kent by a ten-point margin of victory.

On November 29, 2016, Carter was named as a Transition Landing Team member  for the newly elected President Donald Trump in the Department of Justice.

Election of 2014
Carter had announced on July 9, 2013 that she would be a candidate for the Texas Railroad Commission in the Place 1 seat vacated by the outgoing incumbent, Barry Smitherman, who ran instead for Texas Attorney General in 2014 to replace the three-term incumbent, Greg Abbott, the 2014 gubernatorial nominee who seeks to succeed the retiring Governor Rick Perry.

However, on October 22, 2013, Carter announced that she was ending her bid for the Railroad Commission and would instead seek reelection to a third two-year term to her state House seat.

References

1978 births
Living people
Republican Party members of the Texas House of Representatives
Women state legislators in Texas
African-American Catholics
African-American state legislators in Texas
African-American women in politics
Politicians from Dallas
Plano East Senior High School alumni
Moody College of Communication alumni
Harvard Law School alumni
Texas lawyers
Harvard Kennedy School alumni
21st-century American politicians
21st-century American women politicians
Catholics from Texas
21st-century African-American women
21st-century African-American politicians
20th-century African-American people
20th-century African-American women